American singer Beyoncé has embarked on eight concert tours during her solo career, five of which have been worldwide, three which have been collaborative, and one just in Europe. Her solo tour debut (whilst on hiatus with Destiny's Child) began in 2003, with the Dangerously in Love Tour. Based predominantly in the United Kingdom, the tour received an unfavorable review from Dave Simpson of The Guardian based on Beyoncé's costumes and a confusion of her core audience at the time. In 2007, she embarked on her first major solo world tour – The Beyoncé Experience, following Destiny's Child's disbandment in 2005. The tour visited five continents and Beyoncé was lauded by music journalism for her simultaneous dancing and singing abilities. Following the release of her 2008 third studio album I Am... Sasha Fierce, Beyoncé embarked on her next world concert venture, the I Am... World Tour. She collaborated with Thierry Mugler exclusively for the tour's costumes. The I Am... World Tour also marked the first time Beyoncé had performed in South American countries. Beyoncé saw her largest tour to date with 2013-2014's The Mrs. Carter Show World Tour. Grossing US $229,727,960, the 132 date venture was criticised for the name of the tour, as Beyoncé appeared to be letting herself be known as simply Shawn "Jay-Z" Carter's wife, despite being proclaimed as a "modern-day feminist". The tour itself however was lauded by music critics, who again praised Beyoncé's performance abilities and the more advanced production seen compared to her previous tours.
In 2016 Beyoncé saw her most successful tour to date, The Formation Tour grossing more than U$260 million in just 49 shows.

Beside her solo live performances, Beyoncé has also embarked on three collaborative tours. In 2004, she embarked on The Verizon Ladies First Tour in which she co-headlined with Alicia Keys and Missy Elliott. Beyoncé and Keys were widely regarded as the stars of the North American show, although generally, music critics praised the entire ensemble. In 2014, Beyoncé took part in her second collaborative tour; the On the Run Tour, in which she was co-headlining with her aforementioned husband, Jay-Z. The all-stadium tour that took place predominantly in North America as well as two performances in Paris, France, came after both Beyoncé and Jay-Z had finished their own solo tours. The tour was commended for its extensive theme and cinematic storyline, as well as both performers onstage abilities. It grossed US$109.7 million, ranking as the fifth highest-grossing tour of 2014. In 2018, Beyoncé and Jay-Z embarked on their second collaborative tour; the On The Run II Tour. The 48-show tour visited Europe and North America and grossed US$253.5 million, making it the third-highest-grossing tour of 2018. The surprise release of the pair’s debut collaborative album, “Everything is Love”, was announced on stage at the end of their second show in London, UK, on June 16, 2018. Songs from the album began to be incorporated into the tour’s set list at the show in Paris’ Stade de France on July 15, 2018.

Outside of extensive world tours, Beyoncé has also performed a variety of concert residencies and smaller, promotional tours. 2009's I Am... Yours was carried out amongst the time the I Am... World Tour was ongoing. Other residencies include 4 Intimate Nights with Beyoncé, carried out in August 2011 to promote Beyoncé's fourth studio album 4, and 2012's Revel Presents: Beyoncé Live, regarded as her postbirth comeback performance, after giving birth in January 2012. In 2013, Beyoncé headlined the Super Bowl XLVII halftime show, performing a medley of her solo and Destiny's Child recordings (with the latter reuniting on stage for a surprise performance). Generating 110.8 million viewers, the performance is currently the sixth most watched halftime show of all time in the United States, behind Katy Perry, Bruno Mars, Madonna, Coldplay and Lady Gaga. She was featured as a special guest during Coldplay's performance at the show in 2016 along with Bruno Mars.

Tours

Headlining

Co-headlining

Residencies

Concerts and Festivals

Promotional concerts

Music festivals

Live performances

Award show performances

Performances on broadcast shows

Performances at live events

Performances as featured appearance

Footnotes

References

External links
 Tour section at Beyoncé official website
 Tours of Beyoncé at Live Nation

 
Beyonce